Cincu is a commune in Brașov County, Transylvania, Romania. It is composed of two villages, Cincu and Toarcla (Tarteln; Kisprázsmár). Each of these has a fortified church.

Geography 
The commune is located in the northwestern part of the county, on the border with Sibiu County. It lies in the southern reaches of the Transylvanian Plateau, on the banks of the rivers Cincu and Pârâul Nou, both right tributaries of the river Olt.

The commune is crossed by county road DJ105, which runs from nearby Voila to Agnita,  to the northwest, and DJ105A, which runs from nearby Bruiu to Rupea,  to the northeast.

History 

Cincu was first mentioned in a document of 1329 as Schenck, a word connected to Schenke, meaning "tavern" in German. The village was founded in the mid-12th century by some 30 families of German settlers from the Rhineland area in present-day Germany. There were 64 families in 1488, 70 in 1532, and 344 in 1729. Some 215 individuals were settled there by the Habsburgs in 1753. In 1850, there were 2,635 inhabitants. In 1930, there were 2,449, of whom 1,112 were Transylvanian Saxons. In 1956, the population stood at 2,232.

The Saxons' territory was divided into "seats"; among the oldest was the Schenk Seat, with its capital at Cincu. It included 22 localities, among them the current town of Agnita. Cincu has had its own coat of arms since 1448 and was declared a market town in 1474. 

In 1600, its citadel was burned by the troops of Michael the Brave. Historically, the local economy was dominated by agriculture and by craft production organized into guilds for joiners, furriers, harness makers, locksmiths, carpenters, tailors, blacksmiths, cobblers, coopers, wheelwrights, and bricklayers.

The town hall was established in 1804. A significant number of inhabitants began to emigrate to the United States in the 1890s, and the Saxons started to leave en masse in the 1950s. In 1989, 386 Saxons were left; this fell to 136 in 1992, 109 in 1994, and 70 in 2000. The painter Fritz Schullerus moved to a house in Cincu in 1895, dying there three years later.

Toarcla is mentioned in Johannes Honter's cosmography text. It appears on the oldest map of Transylvania, from 1532. The Saxon population left Toarcla as well, so that there were some 20 individuals from the community left by the early 2000s.

Cincu was the seat of the Nagysink District of Nagy-Küküllő County, an administrative county (comitatus) of the Kingdom of Hungary. After World War I, as a result of the Hungarian–Romanian War and the Treaty of Trianon, the commune became part of Făgăraș County, in the Kingdom of Romania.

Demographics
At the 2011 census, the commune had 1,587 inhabitants; of those, 79,14% were ethnic Romanians, 10.84% Roma, 3.4% Hungarians, and 3.34% Germans.

Combat Training Center 

The Romanian Land Forces operate a Combat Training Center in Cincu, where NATO troops have been training as part of the NATO Enhanced Forward Presence. The facility is undergoing a massive expansion in the wake of the 2022 Russian invasion of Ukraine, as the military alliance is  shifting its center of gravity from the Mihail Kogălniceanu Air Base near the Black Sea, to Cincu, near the exact geographical center of Romania.

See also
Villages with fortified churches in Transylvania

References

Communes in Brașov County
Localities in Transylvania